Douglas Alexander (born 1967) is a British politician.

Douglas Alexander may also refer to:

Sir Douglas Alexander, 1st Baronet (1864–1949)
Sir Douglas Hamilton Alexander, 2nd Baronet (1900–1983) of the Alexander baronets
Sir Douglas Alexander, 3rd Baronet (born 1936) of the Alexander baronets
Douglas Gillespie Alexander (born 1962) of the Alexander baronets

See also